Anna Karenina is a 1961 British TV adaptation of Leo Tolstoy's 1877 novel Anna Karenina.

It aired on American television in 1964.

The production was thought lost but a copy was found in 2010.

Cast
Claire Bloom as Anna Karenina
Sean Connery as Count Alexis Vronsky
Jack Watling as Stiva, Prince Oblonsky
Valerie Taylor as Countess Vronsky
Daphne Anderson as Dolly
June Thorburn as Kitty
Albert Lieven as Alexis Karenin

References

External links
Anna Karenina at BFI
Anna Karenina at IMDb

1961 films
1961 television films
British television films
Films based on Anna Karenina